Anatomy of a Disappearance is the second novel by the award-winning Libyan writer Hisham Matar, first published in 2011 by Viking, an imprint of Penguin Books.

Plot summary
The book follows the story of Nuri, a teenager living in exile with his family in Cairo. After the sudden death of his mother, he also loses his father Kamal Pasha el-Alfi who disappears in mysterious circumstances in Switzerland, and it becomes obvious that he was abducted by the regime of their country (which is never named). The young Nuri tries to come to terms with the disappearance of his father.

Characters
Nuri el-Alfi - the young teenage narrator
Kamal Pasha el-Alfi "Baba" "Father" - Nuri's father
Ihsan "Mother" - Nuri's mother
Mona - Nuri's Stepmother
Taleb - Kamal Pasha's best friend
Hydar - Kamal Pasha's best friend
Naima - el-Alfi's young Egyptian maid
Hass - Kamal Pasha's Swiss confidant
Fadhil - Nuri's uncle
Salwa - Nuri's aunt
Souad - Nuri's aunt

Reviews
The Guardian - Hermione Lee
The Independent - David Mattin
Financial Times - Ángel Gurría-Quintana
The National - Luke Kennard
The Observer - Tim Adams

2011 British novels
Libyan novels
Novels by Hisham Matar
Novels set in Cairo
Novels set in London
Viking Press books